Goad refers to a farming implement used to spur livestock, including: 
 Ankus, a goad used for elephants
 Cattle prod, a goad used for cattle

Goad may also refer to:

People with the name
 Alan Goad (born 1954), Australian footballer
 Amanda Goad, 1992 Scripps National Spelling Bee winner
 George Goad (cricketer) (1806–1878), English cricketer
 George Goad (died 1671), master of Eton College
 Jim Goad (born 1961), American author and publisher
 Philip Goad, Australian academic and Professor of Architecture
 Robin Goad (born 1970), American weightlifter

Other uses
 Goad map, Goad plan, or Goad atlas, a navigation resource that incorporates detailed street maps including individual buildings and their uses